Livin' on a Dream is an album by female artist Robin Beck. It was produced and engineered by James Christian, co-produced by Tommy Denander, and mastered and mixed by Dennis Ward. Serafino Perugino served as the executive producer of the album. It was released by Frontiers Records in 2007. There are a total of thirteen songs on the album.

Track listing

External links 
 http://www.robinbeckrocks.com/livinonadream.html

2007 albums
Robin Beck albums
Frontiers Records albums